Évellys is a commune in the Morbihan department of Brittany in north-western France. Naizin is the municipal seat.

History 
On 1 January 2016, Évellys was created by the merger of Moustoir-Remungol, Naizin and Remungol.

References

External links
 

Communes of Morbihan
Communes nouvelles of Morbihan

Populated places established in 2016
2016 establishments in France